Serena Williams was the defending champion, and successfully defended her title, defeating lucky loser CoCo Vandeweghe in the final, 7–5, 6–3. It was the first all-American final on the WTA Tour since the 2009 WTA Tour Championships, and the first on American soil since Los Angeles in 2004.

Seeds 
The top four seeds received a bye into the second round.

Draw

Finals

Top half

Bottom half

Qualifying

Seeds

Qualifiers

Lucky losers 
  Alexa Glatch
  CoCo Vandeweghe
  Zheng Saisai

Draw

First qualifier

Second qualifier

Third qualifier

Fourth qualifier

External links
 WTA tournament draws

Bank of the West Classic - Singles
2012 Singles